Those Were the Days is a 1997 Hong Kong comedy film directed by Dick Cho. The film is an adaptation of the TV series Old Time Buddy, which was produced by TVB, starring returning cast members from the series Gallen Lo, Maggie Cheung and Francis Ng, alongside new cast members Natalis Chan, Monica Chan, Shu Qi, Dayo Wong and Joyce Chan.

Cast
 Natalis Chan as Walter Ngau Tat-wah
 Monica Chan as Chau
 Gallen Lo as Lee Kei
 Maggie Cheung Ho-yee as Ching Po-chu
 Francis Ng as Patrick Tse Yuen
 Shu Qi as Shiu Fong-fong
 Dayo Wong as Wong Ching-wai
 Joyce Chan as Ka-yin
 Lawrence Cheng as Ko
 Cheung Tat-ming as Cheung
 Chor Yuen as Movie
 Ha Ping as Fong-fong's Mother
 Vincent Kok as Wang Tin-lam
 Louis Yuen as Wong Shing
 Alvina Kong as Cheung's Wife
 Lee Kin-yan as Fat fat
 Wayne Lai as Law
 Law Kar-ying as Wong Fei-hung
 Lee Siu-kei as The Director
 Teresa Mak as Derra
 Yee Fan-wei as Kwan Mak-kei
 Kingdom Yuen as Po-chu's Mother
 Michael Tse as Man with lighter in Ku Wak Chai movie

References

External links
 

1997 films
Hong Kong comedy films
1997 comedy films
1990s parody films
1990s Cantonese-language films
Films about actors
Films about time travel
Films set in Hong Kong
Films shot in Hong Kong
Films set in the 1960s
Films based on television series
1990s Hong Kong films